James Richard Comley (born 24 January 1991) is a footballer who plays as a midfielder for Hampton & Richmond Borough and the Montserrat national team.

Club career
Comley came through the youth system at Crystal Palace and made his English Football League debut on 17 March 2009 as a substitute against Barnsley. He made three further appearances in the league in the 2008–09 season, and played twice in the FA Cup the following season, before being released in June 2010.

Comley was without a club in the 2010–11 season due to injury, and trained with Tottenham Hotspur in the first half of the 2011–12 season before joining Canvey Island in January 2012.

He then joined St Albans City for the remainder of the season. For 2012–13, he joined Kettering Town, but made no appearances due to injury and rejoined St Albans in December 2012.

Comley joined Maidenhead United on loan in February 2016. The loan was made permanent at the end of the season. Comley left the Magpies at the end of the 2020–21 season after 196 appearances since first joining the club.

Comley joined Walton Casuals in October 2021. He joined Boreham Wood the following month. Comley was released in June 2022.

On 29 June 2022, Comley joined National League South club Dulwich Hamlet following his release from Boreham Wood.

On 4 March 2023 he signed for Hampton & Richmond Borough.

International career
Comley played for the England C team in October 2014 against a Turkey U23 side.

In March 2015, Comley was called up by Montserrat for 2018 World Cup qualifying, playing in both legs of a 3–4 aggregate defeat to Curaçao.

Personal life
Comley's younger brother Brandon is also a footballer. He is also a Montserrat international and the brothers played together for the first time against El Salvador in September 2018.

Career statistics

Club

International

International goals
Scores and results list Montserrat's goal tally first.

References

External links

Profile at FIFA
Profile at Aylesbury United

Living people
1991 births
Footballers from Holloway, London
Montserratian footballers
Montserrat international footballers
English footballers
Association football midfielders
Crystal Palace F.C. players
Canvey Island F.C. players
Kettering Town F.C. players
St Albans City F.C. players
Maidenhead United F.C. players
Walton Casuals F.C. players
Boreham Wood F.C. players
Dulwich Hamlet F.C. players
Hampton & Richmond Borough F.C. players
English Football League players
National League (English football) players
Isthmian League players
Southern Football League players
English people of Montserratian descent
England semi-pro international footballers
Black British sportsmen